The Buffalo Skinners is the sixth studio album by the Scottish band Big Country, which was released in 1993. Two songs, "We're Not In Kansas" and "Ships", are re-recordings of songs from their previous album. The difference is more noticeable on "Ships" which features heavy use of guitars (in contrast to the guitar-free 1991 version). The album featured two UK top 30 hits, "Alone" (No. 24) and "Ships" (No. 29).

In 2020, Cherry Red Records released a deluxe box-set Out Beyond the River: The Compulsion Years which featured an expanded version of the original album augmented with bonus tracks and the previously released live album Without the Aid of a Safety Net. The set also included a DVD with highlights from the Glasgow Barrowlands concert and promo videos for "Ships" and "Alone". The set is housed in a clamshell box.

Background
After the disappointing sales of their 1991 album No Place Like Home, Big Country were dropped by their label, Phonogram. The band decided to split up, but a couple of weeks later lead vocalist and guitarist Stuart Adamson phoned guitarist Bruce Watson to suggest the band give things another go, and in turn he and bassist Tony Butler agreed to reunite. The band were quickly signed to Compulsion by the label's boss Chris Hughes, who as an A&R man, had originally signed the band to Phonogram in 1982. They recorded The Buffalo Skinners as a trio alongside session drummer Simon Phillips.

In a 1993 interview with Sunday Life, Watson revealed that both Peace in Our Time and No Place Like Home (1991) were "stodgy affairs aimed at the American market" and a compromise to meet with Phonogram's commercial expectations for the band. Watson said, "Now we're back to doing what we do best – being Big Country. The new album is what we are about – we produced it ourselves and are really proud of it." In an interview with The Lennox Herald, Adamson said, "We decided to produce ourselves because ultimately we know what kind of sound we're looking for. In terms of the spirit and commitment this is the best record we've made since the first two. We were told [by Compulsion] just to go in, record it and get over what we wanted musically."

Once the band's former drummer Mark Brzezicki heard the album, he asked to rejoin the band and did so in time for the band's forthcoming tour.

Critical reception

On its release, Neil McKay of Sunday Life praised The Buffalo Skinners as "a long overdue return to form". He wrote, "With the guitars right up front this strays close to hard rock territory, but the songs are as rousing and tuneful as in their early heyday." Adam Sweeting of The Guardian described the album as "quaintly old-fashioned, but performed with conviction". He added, "Big Country still write strident rock anthems with a tartan twist, and reflect on love, greed and blue-collar angst."

Track listing

Personnel
Big Country
Stuart Adamson – guitar, vocals
Tony Butler – bass guitar, backing vocals
Bruce Watson – guitar, mandolin

Additional personnel
Colin Berwick – keyboards
Joe Bull – programming
Simon Phillips – drums

Charts

References

1993 albums
Big Country albums